The Turkish Society for Electron Microscopy is a learned society for the promotion of microscopy in Turkey. It that was founded in 1971 and since then has hosted 19 national congresses on electron microscopy, each with international participation.

Since 2001, the society has been a member of the International Federation of Societies for Microscopy, the European Microscopy Society and International Federation of Societies for Histochemistry and Cytochemistry.

References

1971 establishments in Turkey
European Microscopy Society
Scientific organizations established in 1971
Scientific societies based in Turkey